The Central African Republic has been issuing stamps since 1959. Before this, it was called  Ubangi-Shari.

Ubangi-Shari became an autonomous state within the French Community and was renamed the Central African Republic on 1 December 1958. The Republic became fully independent on 13 August 1960.

From December 4, 1976 to 1979, the country was renamed the Central African Empire when President Bokassa crowned himself emperor. It issued stamps labelled Empire Centrafricaine in 1977.

In 1979 the name of the country was restored to the Central African Republic.

See also
 Postage stamps and postal history of Ubangi-Shari

References

Communications in the Central African Republic
Central African Republic
History of the Central African Republic by topic